First milk can refer to:

 Colostrum - milk produced by the mammary glands of mammals (including humans) in late pregnancy
 First Milk (company) - UK dairy farming co-operative